Maeineann of Clonfert, Bishop of Clonfert, died 1 March 570.

Maeineann was Bishop of Clonfert during the lifetime of Brendan, who had founded it in 553. He was survived by Brendan, who died as Abbot of Clonfert in 576. Maeineann is one of the earliest bishops listed within what is now County Galway. He can be ranked as among the second or third wave of early Christians in south Connacht, after Kerrill, Conainne and Saint Connell.

His feast day is celebrated on 1 March.

References

External links
 Annals of the Four Masters, The Corpus of Electronic Texts

Christian clergy from County Galway
6th-century Irish bishops
570 deaths
Year of birth unknown